Thames is a British television production company that was established on 1 January 2012. The name Thames was revived from Thames Television after being inactive for nearly nine years.

On 23 November 2011, it was announced that Talkback Thames would split into four separate production companies, which are Boundless, Retort, Talkback and Thames.

Productions
1001 Things You Should Know – A Thames Scotland production for Channel 4.
All Star Family Fortunes – Formerly, a Talkback Thames production for ITV.
Bang on the Money – A Thames production for ITV.
Blankety Blank – A Thames production for ITV.
Blockbusters – A Thames production for Challenge (2012) and later Comedy Central (2019).
Break the Safe – A Thames Scotland production in association with BBC Scotland for BBC One.
Britain's Got Talent – A Thames production in association with SYCO Entertainment for ITV.
Confetti - A Thames production for Facebook Watch.
Game of Talents – A Thames production for ITV.
I Can See Your Voice – A Thames and Naked production for BBC One.
Let's Get Gold! – A Thames production in association with Superhero TV for ITV.
Rebound! – A Thames production for ITV.
Supermarket Sweep - A Thames production for ITV (2019).
Take Me Out – Formerly, a Talkback Thames production for ITV.
That Dog Can Dance! – A Thames production in association with SYCOtv for ITV.
The Greatest Dancer – A Thames production in association with SYCO Entertainment for BBC One.
The Price is Right – A Thames production for Channel 4 (2017).
The X Factor – A Thames production in association with SYCO Entertainment for ITV.
Too Hot to Handle – A Thames and Talkback production for Netflix.

References

External links
 

RTL Group
Television production companies of the United Kingdom
British companies established in 2012
2012 establishments in England
Companies based in the London Borough of Camden